Duke of Almazán is a title of Spanish nobility that is accompanied by the dignity of Grandee of Spain. It was granted to Bernardo Abarca de Bolea y Ornes in 1698 by King Charles II.

Dukes of Almazán (1698)
 Bernardo Abarca de Bolea y Ornes, 1st Duchess of Almazán
 Buenaventura Pedro de Alcántara Abarca de Bolea y Bermúdez De Castro, 2nd Duke of Almazán
 Pedro Pablo Abarca de Bolea y Pons de Mendoza, 3rd Duke of Almazán
 Pedro de Alcántara De Silva Fernández de Híjar y Abarca de Bolea, 4th Duke of Almazán
 Agustín Pedro De Silva y Palafox, 5th Duke of Almazán
 Francisca Javiera de Silva y Fitz-James Stuart, 6th Duchess of Almazán
 José Rafael de Silva y Fernández de Híjar Portugal y Palafox, 7th Duke of Almazán
 Cayetano De Silva y Fernández de Córdoba, 8th Duke of Almazán
 Agustín De Silva y Bernuy, 9th Duke of Almazán
 Alfonso de Silva y Campbell, 10th Duke of Almazán
 María Araceli De Silva y Fernández de Córdoba, 11th Duchess of Almazán
 María del Rosario Mariátegui y Silva, 12th Duchess of Almazán
 Natalia Ruth Mariátegui y Muro, 13th Duchess of Almazán

See also
List of dukes in the peerage of Spain
List of current Grandees of Spain

References 

Dukedoms of Spain
Grandees of Spain
Lists of dukes
Lists of Spanish nobility